Walter Röhrig (13 April 1897 – 1945) was a German art director.

Selected filmography
 The Cabinet of Dr. Caligari (1920)
 Masks (1920)
 Parisian Women (1921)
 Island of the Dead (1921)
 Miss Julie (1922)
 Kaddish (1924)
 Luther (1928)
 The Flute Concert of Sanssouci (1930)
 Hocuspocus (1930)
 The Immortal Vagabond (1930)
 Calais-Dover (1931)
 In the Employ of the Secret Service (1931)
 The Countess of Monte Cristo (1932)
 Congress Dances (1932)
 Waltz War (1933)
 Refugees (1933)
 Court Waltzes (1933)
 The Empress and I (1933)
 Season in Cairo (1933)
 Night in May (1934)
 The Young Baron Neuhaus (1934)
 The Csardas Princess (1934)
 The Royal Waltz (1935)
 Savoy Hotel 217 (1936)
 Under Blazing Heavens (1936)
 Diamonds (1937)
 My Son the Minister (1937)
 Rembrandt (1942)
 A Salzburg Comedy (1943)

References

Bibliography
 Michael L. Stephens. Art Directors in Cinema: A Worldwide Biographical Dictionary. McFarland, 1998.

External links

1897 births
1945 deaths
German art directors
Film directors from Berlin